Saxifrage or Saxifraga a plant genus.

Saxifrage may also refer to:

Other plants
Chondrosea cotyledon, pyramidal saxifrage
Pimpinella saxifraga, burnet saxifrage
Chrysosplenium, the golden-saxifrages
Silaum silaus, the pepper-Saxifrage

Others
HMS Saxifrage, two Royal Navy ships
Operation Saxifrage, a World War II military operation
Saxifrage "Sax" Russell, a character in Kim Stanley Robinson's Mars trilogy
Saxifraga Mountain, a mountain in the Ilgachuz Range of British Columbia

See also
 Sassafras, plant whose name may have the same origin